"Goodbye, My Coney Island Baby" is a popular barbershop song composed in 1924 by Les Applegate. The tune was later adopted by Texas A&M for their Aggie War Hymn, the words of which were written in 1918 by J.V. "Pinky" Wilson, while he was serving in France during World War I.

Coney Island Baby is often included in the repertoire of a barbershop quartet. The original lyrics are not related to Coney Island directly, but are about a man abandoning his lover (whom he apparently met at Coney Island) to avoid marriage, the drudgery of which is lamented in the middle section, often known separately as "We All Fall."

An alternative reading can be made by reference to the line "I'm gonna sail upon that ferry boat" which suggests that the song is sung by a man about to take the ferry from Coney Island. Until the subway came to Coney Island in 1920 most visitors would have arrived (and departed) by ferry.

The song is sung by Apu, Chief Wiggum (later replaced by Barney), Homer, and Principal Skinner in The Simpsons episode "Homer's Barbershop Quartet".

References

External links
 
 , one-man multitrack performance
 Chord charts and verses, arrangements by Jim Bottorff

Songs about parting
Songs about islands
1924 songs
Barbershop music
Songs about New York City